Thierry Aubin (6 May 1942 – 21 March 2009) was a French mathematician who worked at the Centre de Mathématiques de Jussieu, and was a leading expert  on Riemannian geometry 
and non-linear partial differential equations. His fundamental contributions to the theory of the Yamabe equation led, in  conjunction with
results of Trudinger  and Schoen, to a proof of the Yamabe Conjecture: every compact Riemannian manifold
can be conformally rescaled to produce a manifold of constant scalar curvature.  Along with Yau, he also showed
that Kähler manifolds with negative first Chern classes always admit Kähler–Einstein metrics, a result closely related to the Calabi conjecture. The latter result, established by Yau, provides the largest class of known examples of compact Einstein manifolds. Aubin was the first mathematician to propose the Cartan–Hadamard conjecture.

Aubin was a visiting scholar at the Institute for Advanced Study in 1979. He was elected to the Académie des sciences in 2003.

Research
In 1970, Aubin established that any closed smooth manifold of dimension larger than two has a Riemannian metric of negative scalar curvature. Furthermore, he proved that a Riemannian metric of nonnegative Ricci curvature can be deformed to positive Ricci curvature, provided that its Ricci curvature is strictly positive at one point.

In the same year, Aubin introduced an approach to the Calabi conjecture, in the field of Kähler geometry, via the calculus of variations. Later, in 1976, Aubin established the existence of Kähler–Einstein metrics on Kähler manifolds whose first Chern class is negative. Independently, Shing-Tung Yau proved the more powerful Calabi conjecture, which concerns the general problem of prescribing the Ricci curvature of a Kähler metric, via non-variational methods. As such, the existence of Kähler–Einstein metrics with negative first Chern class is often called the Aubin–Yau theorem. After learning Yau's techniques from Jerry Kazdan, Aubin found some simplifications and modifications of his work, along with Kazdan and Jean-Pierre Bourguignon.

Aubin made a number of fundamental contributions to the study of Sobolev spaces on Riemannian manifolds. He established Riemannian formulations of many classical results for Sobolev spaces, such as the equivalence of various definitions, the density of various subclasses of functions, and the standard embedding theorems. In one of Aubin's best-known works, the analysis of the optimal constant in the Sobolev embedding theorem was carried out. Along with similar results for the Moser–Trudinger inequality, Aubin later proved improvements of the optimal constants when the functions are assumed to satisfy certain orthogonality constraints.

Such results are naturally applicable to many problems in the field of geometric analysis. Aubin considered the Yamabe problem on conformal deformation to constant scalar curvature, which Yamabe had reduced to a problem in the calculus of variations. Following prior work of Neil Trudinger, Aubin was able to resolve the problem in high dimensions under the condition that the Weyl curvature is nonzero at some point. The key of Aubin's analysis is essentially local, with an estimate on the geometry of the Green's function based on the Weyl curvature. The more subtle case of locally conformally flat manifolds, along with the low-dimensional case, was later established by Richard Schoen as an application of Schoen and Yau's positive mass theorem.

All of the results outlined here, along with many others, were absorbed into Aubin's book Some Nonlinear Problems in Riemannian Geometry, which has become a basic part of the research literature.

Major Publications
Articles. Aubin was the author of around sixty research papers. The following, among the best-known, are outlined above.

Books
Expansion of:

References

External links
 
 Obituary on the SMF Gazette

1942 births
2009 deaths
20th-century French mathematicians
Differential geometers
Members of the French Academy of Sciences
Institute for Advanced Study visiting scholars
École Polytechnique alumni
21st-century French mathematicians